Tate St Ives is an art gallery in St Ives, Cornwall, England, exhibiting work by modern British artists with links to the St Ives area. The Tate also took over management of another museum in the town, the Barbara Hepworth Museum and Sculpture Garden, in 1980.

The Tate St Ives was built between 1988 and 1993 on the site of an old gasworks and looks over Porthmeor beach. In 2015, it received funding for an expansion, doubling the size of the gallery, and closed in October 2015 for refurbishment. The gallery re-opened in October 2017 and is among the most visited attractions in the UK.

History 
In 1980, Tate group started to manage the Barbara Hepworth Museum and Sculpture Garden, dedicated to the life and work of the renowned St Ives artist. The group decided to open a museum in the town, to showcase local artists, especially those already held in their collection.

In 1988, the group purchased a former gasworks and commissioned architects Eldred Evans and David Shalev, to design a building for the gallery in a similar style to the gas works. The building began in 1991, funded by the European Regional Development Fund, the Henry Moore Foundation and donations from the public. It included a rotunda at the centre of the gallery, looking over Porthmeor Beach and was completed in 1993. The gallery opened in June 1993, the second of the Tate's regional galleries after Tate Liverpool, receiving more than 120,000 visitors before the end of the year. 

In 1999, to celebrate the solar eclipse (as St Ives was predicted to be the first British town to witness the event), Tate St Ives held an exhibition called As Dark as Light, exhibiting work from Garry Fabian Miller, Gia Edzveradze and Yuko Shiraishi alongside art from local schoolchildren.

In January 2015, the Tate St Ives received £3.9 million to build an extension to the existing gallery, with the intention of doubling the available space in order to accommodate tourists throughout the year. The contract was awarded to BAM Construct UK, who would be adding a  extension, with the original architect's involvement. The Tate St Ives was closed in October 2015 for these works and remained closed until October 2017.

In July 2018, Tate St. Ives won the Art Fund Museum of the Year Prize, beating the other shortlisted museums (the Brooklands Museum, the Ferens Art Gallery, Glasgow Women's Library and the Postal Museum, London) to the £100,000 prize. Later that month, the Royal Institute of British Architects announced that the new Tate building had reached the shortlist for the 2018 Stirling Prize. It was beaten by the Bloomberg Building in London, by Foster + Partners.

Exhibitions
Notable exhibitions prior to the refurbishment include:
Simon Carroll, 8 October 2005 – 15 January 2006
The Dark Monarch - Magic and Modernity in British Art, 10 October 2009 -10 January 2010 
The Indiscipline of Painting, 8 October 2011 – 3 January 2012 touring to Warwick Art Centre (2011/12)

Since the refurbishment, Tate St Ives has showcased the following exhibitions:
 Rebecca Warren All That Heaven Allows, 14 October 2017 – 7 January 2018
 Virginia Woolf: An Exhibition Inspired by Her Writings, 10 February – 29 April 2018
Patrick Heron, 19 May – 30 September 2018 (In association with Turner Contemporary)
Rosalind Nashashibi and Lucy Skaer, Thinking through other artists 20 October 2018 – 6 January 2019
Amie Siegel: Provenance, 20 October 2018 – 6 May 2019
Anna Boghiguian, 19 January – 6 May 2019
Huguette Caland, 24 May 2019 – 1 September 2019
Otobong Nkanga 12 October 2019 - 5 January 2020 
Naum Gabo 25 January - 3 May 2020
Haegue Yang: Strange Attractors, 24 October 2020 - 3 May 2021, later extended until 26 September 2021 due to the COVID-19 pandemic.
Petrit Halilaj, 16 October 2021 - 16 January 2022.

See also

List of St Ives artists
Tate Liverpool
Tate Modern

Notes

References

External links

 Tate St Ives website

 Tate St Ives
1993 establishments in England
Art museums established in 1993
Art museums and galleries in St Ives, Cornwall
Modern art museums in the United Kingdom
Cornish culture
Museums sponsored by the Department for Digital, Culture, Media and Sport